Ryde may refer to:

Places
 Ryde, British seaside town and civil parish
 City of Ryde, local government area in Sydney, Australia
 Ryde, New South Wales, suburb of Sydney, Australia
 Electoral district of Ryde, New South Wales, Australia
 Ryde, California, unincorporated community in Sacramento County, California, United States

People
 Steven Ryde (born 1971), British actor, voice-over artist and producer 
 Anne-Lie Rydé (born 1956), Swedish pop and rock singer

Other
 PS Ryde, paddle steamer commissioned as a passenger ferry between mainland England and the Isle of Wight
 The Ryde, a shuttle bus system serving Brigham Young University in Provo, Utah, United States
 Ryde (film), a 2017 film